Facundo Isa (born 21 September 1993) is an Argentine rugby union footballer who plays as a loose forward for Rugby Club Toulonnais and the Argentina national rugby union team.

International career

Isa was a member of the Argentina Under-20 side which competed in the 2012 and 2013 IRB Junior World Championships, he also represented the Argentina Jaguars side in 2014 and played for the Pampas XV during their 2014 tour of Oceania.

Isa was part of the national team which competed at the 2015 Rugby World Cup.

References

1993 births
Living people
People from La Banda
Rugby union flankers
RC Toulonnais players
Argentine people of Arab descent
Jaguares (Super Rugby) players
Argentine people of Syrian descent
Argentine rugby union players
Argentina international rugby union players
Argentine expatriate rugby union players
Argentine expatriate sportspeople in France
Expatriate rugby union players in France
Sportspeople from Santiago del Estero Province
Pampas XV players